National Collegiate Players also known as Pi Epsilon Delta  was an honor society for participants in collegiate theatre founded in 1919.

History

Pi Epsilon Delta was established at the University of Wisconsin on June 8, 1919. The first group contained 17 men and women, including 4 faculty members. Key people included the first president Ray E. Holcolm, first vice president Lawrence W. Murphy and Frances Allen Tucker who designed the key which was the emblem of the organization. It was established as a purely honorary group.

By 1922, additional chapters were present at Washington University in St. Louis, University of Minnesota and Northwestern University. In that year, Pi Epsilon Delta merged with Associated University Players to form National Collegiate Players. The ideals and scope of the new National Collegiate Players were identical to those of Pi Epsilon Delta. Associated University Players had been founded in 1913 at University of Illinois and had chapters at Ohio University, University of Washington and University of Oregon. All but the chapter at the University of Washington voted to join the merged organization. The name National Collegiate Players was adopted due to resistance to continuing the form of a Greek letter organization, that being viewed as yet another secret order.

The Key and Motto of Pi Epsilon Delta were maintained in the new organization.

Jewelry and Symbols
The Pi Epsilon Delta pin contained the two masks of drama and the letters Pi Epsilon Delta.

References

Student societies in the United States
Honor societies
Theatrical organizations in the United States
Fraternities and sororities in the United States
Student organizations established in 1919
1919 establishments in Wisconsin
Former members of Association of College Honor Societies